Esat Sagay (1874 – 22 May 1938) was an Ottoman-born Turkish military officer, educator, politician and former government minister.

Life
He was born in Karaferye, a town close to Thessaloniki, Greece, then a part of the Ottoman Empire, in 1874. 
He graduated from the military academy in 1894. Following a service term in Syria, then a part of the Ottoman Empire, he returned to İstanbul as a teacher in the military academy. Mustafa Kemal (later Atatürk), who would be the founder of Turkish Republic, was among his students. During World War I, he fought in the Gallipoli Campaign. In 1919, while in the rank of a colonel, he retired from the military service, and returned to civilian life.  He died on 22 May 1938.

Political life
He joined the Republican People's Party  and in 1927, was elected into the parliament as a deputy of Bursa Province. In the 6th and the 7th government, he served as the Ministrer of National Education between 27 September 1930 and 19 September 1932. Being a former teacher of Mustafa Kemal Pasha, he was one of the most prestigious members of the cabinet. However, he was a conservative minister, and was severely criticized by Reşit Galip, one of the revolutionists of the party. Finally, Esat Sagay resigned from his post in the ministry, and was replaced by Reşit Galip. His memoirs were later published . In his memoirs, he claims that he was instrumental in Reşit Galip's appointment as his successor.

References

External links

1874 births
1938 deaths
People from Veria
Ottoman Military Academy alumni
Ottoman military officers
Ottoman military personnel of World War I
Educators from the Ottoman Empire
Republican People's Party (Turkey) politicians
Deputies of Bursa
Ministers of National Education of Turkey
Macedonian Turks